The 2014–15 UEFA Europa League group stage was played from 18 September to 11 December 2014. A total of 48 teams competed in the group stage to decide 24 of the 32 places in the knockout phase of the 2014–15 UEFA Europa League.

Draw
The draw was held on 29 August 2014, 13:00 CEST, at the Grimaldi Forum in Monaco. The 48 teams were allocated into four pots based on their UEFA club coefficients at the beginning of the season, with the title holders being placed in Pot 1 automatically. They were drawn into twelve groups of four containing one team from each of the four seeding pots, with the restriction that teams from the same national association could not be drawn against each other. Moreover, the draw was controlled for teams from the same association in order to split the teams evenly into the two sets of groups (A–F, G–L) for maximum television coverage.

The fixtures are decided after the draw. On each matchday, six groups play their matches at 19:00 CEST/CET, while the other six groups play their matches at 21:05 CEST/CET, with the two sets of groups (A–F, G–L) alternating between each matchday. There are other restrictions: for example, teams from the same city in general do not play at home on the same matchday (UEFA tries to avoid teams from the same city playing at home on the same day), and Russian teams do not play at home on the last matchday due to cold weather.

On 17 July 2014, the UEFA emergency panel ruled that Ukrainian and Russian clubs would not be drawn against each other "until further notice" due to the political unrest between the countries. Therefore, Ukrainian clubs Dynamo Kyiv, Metalist Kharkiv (both Pot 1) and Dnipro Dnipropetrovsk (Pot 2), and Russian clubs Dynamo Moscow and Krasnodar (both Pot 4) could not be drawn into the same group despite being in different pots.

Teams
Below were the 48 teams which qualified for the group stage (with their 2014 UEFA club coefficients), grouped by their seeding pot. They include 7 teams which enter in this stage, the 31 winners of the play-off round, and the 10 losers of the Champions League play-off round.

Notes

Format
In each group, teams played against each other home-and-away in a round-robin format. The group winners and runners-up advanced to the round of 32, where they were joined by the eight third-placed teams from the Champions League group stage.

Tiebreakers
The teams were ranked according to points (3 points for a win, 1 point for a draw, 0 points for a loss). If two or more teams were equal on points on completion of the group matches, the following criteria were applied to determine the rankings:
higher number of points obtained in the group matches played among the teams in question;
superior goal difference from the group matches played among the teams in question;
higher number of goals scored in the group matches played among the teams in question;
higher number of goals scored away from home in the group matches played among the teams in question;
If, after applying criteria 1 to 4 to several teams, two or more teams still have an equal ranking, criteria 1 to 4 are reapplied exclusively to the matches between the teams in question to determine their final rankings. If this procedure does not lead to a decision, criteria 6 to 8 apply;
superior goal difference from all group matches played;
higher number of goals scored from all group matches played;
higher number of coefficient points accumulated by the club in question, as well as its association, over the previous five seasons.

Groups
The matchdays were 18 September, 2 October, 23 October (one home match of Metalist Kharkiv played on 22 October), 6 November, 27 November, and 11 December 2014. The match kickoff times were 19:00 and 21:05 CEST/CET, except for matches in Russia and Azerbaijan and one home match each of Dnipro Dnipropetrovsk and Metalist Kharkiv which were 18:00 CEST/CET, and two home matches of Dynamo Moscow which were 17:00 CEST/CET. Times up to 25 October 2014 (matchdays 1–3) were CEST (UTC+2), thereafter (matchdays 4–6) times were CET (UTC+1).

Group A

Notes

Group B

Group C

Group D

Group E

The match was abandoned at half-time due to heavy rainfall, and was resumed on 28 November 2014, 17:00, from the point of abandonment.

Group F

Notes

Group G

Group H

Group I

Group J

Notes

Group K

Notes

Group L

Notes

References

External links
2014–15 UEFA Europa League

2
2014-15